Sir Richard Grenville (1678 – 17 February 1727) was a British politician who sat in the House of Commons from 1715 to 1727.

Early life
Grenville was the son of Sir Richard Grenville of Wotton in Buckinghamshire and his wife Eleanor Temple née Tyrell, the wife of Sir Peter Temple of Stantonbury, Buckinghamshire. He married Hester Temple, the daughter of Sir Richard Temple, 3rd Baronet by a licence of 25 November 1710. Her brother was Richard Temple, 1st Viscount Cobham whose peerage was entailed upon her and her sons.

Political career
Grenville was proposed as Whig candidate for Buckinghamshire at the 1715 general election but by an agreement with Richard Hampden he was elected Member of Parliament for Wendover instead. At the 1722 general election he was returned unopposed as MP for Buckingham on the interest of Lord Cobham.

Death and legacy
Grenville died on 17 February 1727 in the last year of that parliament and his children were taken care of by his brother-in-law Lord Cobham. He was the father, father-in-law and grandfather of various Prime Ministers of the United Kingdom. Among his male-line descendants were the future Earls Temple and Dukes of Buckingham and Chandos.

His wife Hester inherited the titles of her brother in 1749 and became 1st Countess Temple in her own right. Richard and Hester were the parents of six sons and a daughter. Five sons served in parliament:
 Richard Grenville-Temple, 2nd Earl Temple
 George Grenville, Prime Minister of the UK (1763–65)
 James Grenville
 Henry Grenville
 Thomas Grenville

A daughter, Hester, was the wife of Pitt the elder, also a Prime Minister of the UK. Two of Richard's grandsons, Pitt the younger and William Grenville, also rose to serve as Prime Minister.

References

Bibliography
 Johnson, Allen S. A prologue to revolution: the political career of George Grenville (1712–1770). University Press of America, 1997.
 Lawson, Phillip. George Grenvile: A Political Life. University of Manchester Press, 1984.

1678 births
1727 deaths
Members of the Parliament of Great Britain for English constituencies
Richard
British MPs 1715–1722
British MPs 1722–1727
People from Buckinghamshire
Parents of prime ministers of the United Kingdom